Fort Worth International Airport may refer to:

Fort Worth Meacham International Airport
Dallas/Fort Worth International Airport